Javier Alberto Conte (born September 7, 1975 in Buenos Aires) is an Argentine sailboat racer.

Teaming up with Juan de la Fuente, he raced for Argentina on the 2000 Summer Olympics at Sydney, Australia finishing in third place and obtaining a bronze medal for his country. Considered for many as one of the best yachtman of his era, he continues to race around the world placing himself as a constant protagonist in all the races in which he participates. Javier won the gold medal at the 2015 Pan American Games.

References
 

1975 births
Living people
Sportspeople from Buenos Aires
Argentine male sailors (sport)
Olympic sailors of Argentina
Olympic bronze medalists for Argentina
Olympic medalists in sailing
Sailors at the 2000 Summer Olympics – 470
Sailors at the 2004 Summer Olympics – 470
Sailors at the 2008 Summer Olympics – 470
Pan American Games gold medalists for Argentina
Sailors at the 2015 Pan American Games
Medalists at the 2000 Summer Olympics
Pan American Games medalists in sailing
Sailors at the 2019 Pan American Games
Medalists at the 2015 Pan American Games
Medalists at the 2019 Pan American Games
Cadet class world champions